Tomohiro Hatta (born 1986 in Sapporo, Japan) is a Japanese pianist. 

Born in 1986, Hatta began his musical studies at the age of 5 with M. Endo and at 10 with N. Miyazawa. Honored by the 10th Hamamatsu International Piano Academy, in September 2005 he headed to Paris and continued his musical career at the Ecole Normale de Musique de Paris, Conservatoire National de Région de Paris and Conservatoire Départemental de Genevilliers. In 2016 Tomohiro Hatta obtained his Master Degree in Piano Performance at ESART.

Hatta played in theaters all over the world such as Salle Pleyel in Paris, Tribeca in New York and Rudolfinum Hall in Prague, and Festivals such as Bon Anniversaire Monsieur Chopin, Festival "Carré d'As Jeunes Talents", Chopin Festival in Paris (Bagatelle), Dias da Musica, IMAGO Festival, Delhi International Arts Festival, Pafos 2017 - European Capital of Culture 2017, among others. 

Hatta has been awarded several prizes such as International Piano Competition Rudolfinum Firkusny, Smetana Prize, International Piano Competition Son Altesse Royale La Princesse Lalla Meryem, Maria Campina Piano Competition, International Piano Competition Orchestra Sion, A. Scriabine Piano Competition, among many others.

Hatta recorded for France 3, RFI, RDP-Antena 2, Sloveniae National Radio, among others, and two unique albums dedicated to A. Keil and G. Daddi, the latter who played with F. Liszt. Tomohiro Hatta is currently a piano teacher at the Conservatories of Music Coudray-Montceaux and Vauréal in France.

External links 
 Site Hamamatsu International Piano Academy
 Site Ecole Normale de Musique de Paris Alfred Cortot
 Sie Conservatoire à rayonnement régional de Paris - CRR
 [Escola Superior de Artes Aplicadas Site Escola Superior de Artes Aplicadas]
 Site consacré au pianiste
 Sapo Magazine 
 Embassade Portugal au Japon
 Expresso Magazine
 Diario Digital Castelo Branco Magazine
 IPCB Magazine
 Musicaldas 2012
 site Conservatoire à Rayonnement Régional de Cergy-Pontoise
 Site Tomohiro HATTA

1986 births
21st-century classical pianists
École Normale de Musique de Paris alumni
Japanese classical pianists
Japanese male classical pianists
Living people
Long-Thibaud-Crespin Competition prize-winners
Musicians from Sapporo